Lonely is the fourth extended play (EP) by Australian alternative rock group Frente!. It was released in Australia in May 1994 and peaked at number seven on the Australian Singles Chart, earning a gold sales certification. Prior to the EP's release, "Lonely" was originally issued as a three-track single in January 1994 and peaked at number 88 on the Australian Singles Chart.

Track listings
All songs were written by Angie Hart and Simon Austin unless otherwise noted.

Australian CD and maxi-cassette single
 "Lonely"
 "Explode"
 "Get Real" (with Dean and Gene Ween)
 "Not Given Lightly" 
 "Bizarre Love Triangle" 

Three-track CD single version
 "Lonely"
 "Explode"
 "Get Real" (with Dean and Gene Ween)

Charts

Weekly charts

Year-end charts

Certifications

References

Frente! albums
Indie pop EPs
EPs by Australian artists
1994 EPs